Cleavage and polyadenylation specificity factor subunit 2 is a protein that in humans is encoded by the CPSF2 gene. This protein is a subunit of the cleavage and polyadenylation specificity factor (CPSF) complex which plays a key role in pre-mRNA 3' end processing and polyadenylation.

References

External links

Further reading